Marie P. St. Fleur (born May 4, 1962) is a Haitian American politician and lawyer. former Massachusetts State Representative who represented the Fifth Suffolk district from 1999-2011.  Her district consisted of parts of the Boston neighborhoods Dorchester and Roxbury. She is the first Haitian-American to hold public office in Massachusetts.  Representative St. Fleur was one of the most active supporters of John Kerry's presidential bid, often traveling to Florida to do outreach on his behalf.  Representative St. Fleur was appointed Vice-Chair of the powerful Ways and Means Committee by House Speaker Salvatore DiMasi, a leadership position that has tremendous influence in the budget process. On January 30, 2006 Thomas F. Reilly, candidate for the Democratic nomination for governor, selected St. Fleur as his running mate. Candidates for governor and lieutenant governor run separately through the primary, then are joined as a single ticket for the election. The following day she withdrew after The Boston Globe reported that she was delinquent in tax debts and owed over $40,000 in student loans.

In February 2019 Marie St. Fleur announced that she is the Chief Operating Officer of Union Twist a company that has been established to operate a marijuana dispensary in Framingham, Massachusetts.

Personal life and education
St. Fleur emigrated from Haiti as a child and attended the University of Massachusetts Amherst and Boston College Law School. She began practicing law in 1987. In 1999, she became the first Haitian immigrant to hold public office in Massachusetts by winning a special election to succeed Charlotte Golar Richie. She was the vice chair of the House Ways and Means committee.  She has three children.

Legal career
From 1987 to 1988 she was a judicial law clerk for the Massachusetts Superior Court. From 1988 to 1991 she was an assistant district attorney in the Middlesex County District Attorney's office. From 1991 to 1999 she was an assistant attorney general in the Massachusetts Attorney General's office.

Political career
She is a former staffer to former Mayor of Boston Thomas Menino.

The issue of St. Fleur's withdrawal received additional media attention when it was mentioned in an exchange between Reilly and rivals for the Democratic nomination Deval Patrick and Chris Gabrieli during the gubernatorial debate on September 7, 2006. Reilly accused Gabrieli of having leaked a secret report about St. Fleur's finances to the Boston Globe. Later in the debate he asked Patrick, who has confessed to tax problems of his own: "If Marie St. Fleur can't be lieutenant governor, how can you be governor?"

She supports charter schools and in-state tuition for undocumented immigrants.  She is a practicing Catholic and supports same-sex marriage, despite the church's pronouncements on the issue.
During the 2008 presidential primary campaign, St. Fleur initially supported Hillary Clinton for president.

In February 2010 she announced that she would not run for reelection and in April 2010 she accepted a job as director of intergovernmental relations for the City of Boston. She left that position in 2013.

Post-political career
From 2013 to 2016 she served as the president and chief executive officer of the Bessie Tartt Wilson Initiative for Children, Inc. From 2019 to 2020 she served as the executive director of King Boston (also known as the Boston Foundation). Since 2016 she has served as the principal of St. Fleur Communications.

References

External links
 Marie St. Fleur at the Massachusetts State Legislature website
 Marie St. Fleur, Famous Haitian Americans

Haitian emigrants to the United States
American politicians of Haitian descent
Members of the Massachusetts House of Representatives
1962 births
Living people
University of Massachusetts Amherst alumni
Boston College Law School alumni
Women state legislators in Massachusetts
People from Dorchester, Massachusetts
Catholics from Massachusetts
21st-century American lawyers
20th-century American lawyers
20th-century American politicians
21st-century American politicians
Massachusetts lawyers
20th-century American women
21st-century American women politicians
20th-century American women politicians